Turky Al-Thagafi is a Saudi Arabian football player.

External links
 
 
 2009-10 Profile at slstat.com (2009-2010)
 2010-11 Profile at slstat.com (2010-2011)
 2011-12 Profile at slstat.com (2011-2012)
 2012-13 Profile at slstat.com (2012-2013)
 

1986 births
Living people
Saudi Arabian footballers
Al-Ahli Saudi FC players
Al-Rayyan SC players
Najran SC players
Al-Ansar FC (Medina) players
Al-Shoulla FC players
Saudi Professional League players
Saudi Arabian expatriate footballers
Association football midfielders
Expatriate footballers in Qatar
Saudi Arabian expatriate sportspeople in Qatar